Dolichandrone is a genus of flowering plants in the family Bignoniaceae.

Species
 Dolichandrone alba (Sim) Sprague	
 Dolichandrone alternifolia (R.Br.) Seem.	
 Dolichandrone arcuata (Wight) C.B.Clarke
 Dolichandrone atrovirens (Roth) K.Schum.	
 Dolichandrone columnaris Santisuk	
 Dolichandrone falcata (Wall. ex DC.) Seem.	
 Dolichandrone filiformis (DC.) Fenzl ex F.Muell.	
 Dolichandrone heterophylla (R.Br.) F.Muell.
 Dolichandrone occidentalis Jackes
 Dolichandrone serrulata (Wall. ex DC.) Seem.	
 Dolichandrone spathacea (L.f.) Seem.

References

External links

 
Bignoniaceae genera